The Kansas City Renegades were a charter member of the Champions Professional Indoor Football League based in Kansas City, Missouri. They played their home games at Kemper Arena.

The Renegades were the second arena/indoor team based in Kansas City, following the Kansas City Command (previously known as the Kansas City Brigade) which played in the Arena Football League from 2006 until 2008 and then again from 2011 until 2012.  The franchise abruptly folded in 2013 with no explanation.

Franchise history

2012
The Renegades came about when the team purchased the physical assets of the Command. The Renegades are owned by Jeremy Ploeger; founder of sports management firm J&M Management, vice chairman of the Jackson County Board of Planning & Zoning Adjustments, and a former candidate for the Missouri House of Representatives in the 51st District.  In addition, general manager Reggie Harris was the Brigade's general manager for their inaugural season. On September 20, 2012, the franchise announced that it would be nicknamed the "Renegades," with spokesman, Darron Story stating, "The Renegades name comes from going against the grain and represents our effort to separate ourselves from the past unsuccessful franchises. You have to have a renegade attitude to come behind that and be excited and have energy."

Final roster

2013
The Renegades opened the season poorly with losses to Omaha and Sioux City to drop to 0-2, but bounced back in the following three weeks with wins over Oklahoma, Wichita and Kansas (Topeka). The first two wins over Oklahoma and Wichita came largely to the credit of both kick returner O. J. Simpson (unrelated to the NFL running back) who earned CPIFL Special Teams player of the week honors after scoring two touchdowns on kick returns against Wichita, and wide receiver Clinton Solomon who scored 4 touchdowns against Oklahoma and was named CPIFL Offensive player of the week on that day. Solomon raised his season total to 6 against Wichita the following week. Xavier Lee also led the team to victory against Wichita despite setting foot in Kansas City for the first time only a few days before the game. The Renegades defeated the Kansas Koyotes in week 6 to jump to their first time over .500 in franchise history.  They finished the season 8-4.  The team is not playing in the 2014 season, the team has chosen to take the season off to "reorganize". No announcements about future play have been made.

Season schedule

References

External links
 Kansas City Renegades official website
 CPIFL official website

American football teams in Kansas City, Missouri
Former Champions Professional Indoor Football League teams
Sports in the Kansas City metropolitan area
American football teams established in 2012
American football teams disestablished in 2013
2012 establishments in Missouri
2013 disestablishments in Missouri